David Willoughby Gooding (16 September 1925 Ipswich – England 30 August 2019) was a British lecturer, author, and professor of Greek at Queen's University, Belfast.

Born in Ipswich, England, Gooding was the youngest of six children: four brothers and two sisters. His mother died when he was nine, and as a young man he helped with the care of his father.

After the Second World War, Gooding studied Classics at Trinity College, Cambridge (1947–54). He was then appointed to a Post–Doctoral Research Fellowship, studying ancient manuscripts at Durham University from 1954–59.

From 1959–79, Gooding was a lecturer and then reader in Classics at Queen's University, Belfast. He was appointed professor of Old Testament Greek in 1979, and professor of Greek in 1983. He retired in 1986, becoming professor emeritus. He was elected as a member of the Royal Irish Academy in 1977.

As well as academic monographs and articles relating to the Septuagint, Gooding published many Bible commentaries, apologetic works, and a manual on the New Testament's use of the Old. His books have been translated into over twenty–five languages. In 1989 Gooding and John Lennox began working on books and articles to be published in Russia and Ukraine.

During his time in Northern Ireland, David was an active member of a Gospel Assembly in Belfast, meeting in Apsley Hall. He travelled widely, giving Bible talks and lectures on a wide variety of books and topics. .

Works

Thesis

Books 
Gooding's books include:

See also 
John Lennox

References

External links 
 Text of several books by David Gooding and John Lennox

1925 births
2019 deaths
Academics of Queen's University Belfast
Members of the Royal Irish Academy
Old Testament scholars
Academics of Durham University